Tirunallam Umamaheswarar Temple is a Hindu temple located at  Nagapattinam district of Tamil Nadu, India. The presiding deity is Shiva. He is called as Umamaheswarar. His consort is Degasoundari.

Significance 
It is one of the shrines of the 275 Paadal Petra Sthalams - Shiva Sthalams glorified in the early medieval Tevaram poems by Tamil Saivite Nayanar saints Tirunavukkarasar and Thirugnana Sambandar.

Structure 
After the entrance, in the right side shrine of Muruga and in the left side Ganapathi shrine is found. In the front mondapa flagpost, balipeeta and nandhi are found. On the roof of the temple in the right, left and centre beautiful paintings are found. They include the history of the temple and the festivals conducted in the temple. At the right of the rajagopura,  Vinayaka is found. The shrine of the goddess is facing east. In the sanctum sanctorum the presiding deity is found. On either side gatekeepers are found. In the kosta, miniature sculptures are found. And don't miss the huge bronze Natraja in this temple

References

Paintings and sculptures found in the temple

Paintings

Sculptures

Shiva temples in Nagapattinam district
Padal Petra Stalam